Midewin may refer to:

 Midewin National Tallgrass Prairie, a grassland preserve in Illinois, USA (name based on alternate spelling of Midewiwin).
 Midewiwin, an aboriginal North American religion/society